Walter G Jung, commonly known as Walt Jung, is an American electronic engineer and author. He worked for Linear Technology and Analog Devices. He has written a number of books, the most popular of which is the IC Op Amp Cookbook, which has been in print since 1974.

He was named a Fellow of the Audio Engineering Society in 1979 for his work on distortion in operational amplifiers. He also was named to Electronic Design’s Engineering Hall of Fame in 2002. He is highly regarded as a design engineer.

Publications
 Op Amp Applications Handbook; 1st Ed; Newnes; 2005; .
 Audio IC Op-Amp Applications; 3rd Ed; Sams Publishing; 1987; .
 IC Op-Amp Cookbook; 3rd Ed; Prentice Hall; 1986; .
 IC Timer Cookbook; 2nd Ed; Sams Publishing; 1983; . 
 IC Array Cookbook; 1st Ed; Hayden; 1980; .
 IC Converter Cookbook; 1st Ed; Sams Publishing; 1978; .
 Unique IC Op-Amp Applications; 1st Ed; Sams Publishing; 1975; .

References

External links
 Personal website

Living people
American electronics engineers
American engineering writers
Year of birth missing (living people)